Froxfield in Hampshire is a hamlet in the civil parish of Froxfield and Privett containing several small hamlets including Privett.  Froxfield and Privett stand approximately 3 miles WNW of Petersfield within the East Hampshire Area of Outstanding Natural Beauty (AONB) of Hampshire. Entirely within South Downs National Park, it sits on high ground overlooking the Hangers.

Evidence of ancient settlement in Froxfield includes traces of a Romans encampment in the south of the parish. Fragments of an earthwork running across the Parish are supposed to have formed part of the boundary between the ancient kingdoms of Wessex and Sussex.

The village has two churches, St Peter on the Green, built in 1884 on the site of the original 12th century church and St Peter's, High Cross was built in 1862 after the original Norman parish church at Froxfield Green was demolished, it contains the Norman pillars from the previous church.  Holy Trinity Church, Privett is a redundant Grade II* listed church in the ecclesiastical parish of Froxfield.

At the 2011 Census the hamlet had become a civil parish in its own name. The population in 2011 was 961.

Pubs 
The two highest pubs in Hampshire are The White Horse, more commonly known as The Pub With No Name and The Trooper Inn which at the beginning of the First World War it is said that the pub was used as a recruiting centre for troops, although it is not known whether this was the source of the Trooper name.

Education 

Froxfield CofE Primary and Pre-School  is the only school within the Parish. The school has roughly 103 pupils and age ranges from 4 – 11 years old.

References

Villages in Hampshire